Ângelo Antônio Carneiro Lopes (born 4 June 1964) is a Brazilian actor.

Selected filmography

Film

Television

References

External links
 

1964 births
Living people
Brazilian male film actors
People from Minas Gerais